The 1969–70 Danish 1. division season was the 13th season of ice hockey in Denmark. Eight teams participated in the league, and KSF Copenhagen won the championship.

Regular season

External links
Season on eliteprospects.com

Danish
1969 in Danish sport
1970 in Danish sport